The 2004–2005 Shell Turbo Chargers season was the 20th and final season of the franchise in the Philippine Basketball Association (PBA).

Draft picks

Transactions

Occurrences
American John Moran was named Shell's new head coach starting the season, replacing Perry Ronquillo, Moran was signed to a six-month contract but on March 22, he was sacked by Shell management after the Turbo Chargers tallied a 1–5 won-loss record, Moran was succeeded by former Shell cager Leo Austria.

Roster

Philippine Cup

Game log

|- bgcolor="#edbebf"
| 1
| October 6
| Coca Cola
| 83–91
| Tubid (15)
| 
| 
| Araneta Coliseum
| 0–1
|- bgcolor="#bbffbb" 
| 2
| October 12
| Red Bull
| 93–86
| Alvarez (27)
| 
| 
| Cagayan de Oro
| 1–1
|- bgcolor="#bbffbb" 
| 3
| October 15
| Sta.Lucia
| 84–78
| Dela Cruz (24)
| 
| 
| Philsports Arena
| 2–1
|- bgcolor="#bbffbb" 
| 4
| October 20
| San Miguel
| 70–67
| Tubid (18)
| 
| 
| Araneta Coliseum
| 3–1
|- bgcolor="#bbffbb" 
| 5
| October 24
| Brgy.Ginebra
| 86–81
| Dela Cruz (28)
| 
| 
| Araneta Coliseum
| 4–1
|- bgcolor="#bbffbb" 
| 6
| October 28
| Alaska
| 80–78 OT
| Mamaril (16)
| 
| 
| Iloilo City
| 5–1

|- bgcolor="#edbebf" 
| 7
| November 3
| Talk 'N Text
| 
| 
| 
| 
| Araneta Coliseum
| 5–2
|- bgcolor="#edbebf"
| 8
| November 10
| Red Bull
| 90–94
| 
| 
| 
| Araneta Coliseum
| 5–3
|- bgcolor="#bbffbb"
| 10
| November 17
| FedEx
| 101–99
| 
| 
| 
| Araneta Coliseum
| 6–4

|- bgcolor="#bbffbb" 
| 14
| December 1
| Alaska
| 89–85
| Dela Cruz (24)
| 
| 
| Araneta Coliseum
| 9–5
|- bgcolor="#bbffbb" 
| 15
| December 5
| Sta. Lucia
| 84–83
| Dela Cruz (27)
| 
| 
| Araneta Coliseum
| 10–5
|- bgcolor="#edbebf" 
| 16
| December 9
| Brgy.Ginebra
| 
| 
| 
| 
| Urdaneta City
| 10–6
|- bgcolor="#bbffbb"
| 17
| December 15
| Talk 'N Text
| 103–98
| Tubid (28)
| 
| 
| Araneta Coliseum
| 11–6
|- bgcolor="#bbffbb" 
| 18
| December 19
| FedEx
| 90–85
| Calaguio (28)
| 
| 
| Makati Coliseum
| 12–6

Recruited imports

GP – Games played

References

Shell
Shell Turbo Chargers seasons